The  Upper Atmosphere Research Panel, also known as the V-2 Panel, was formed in 1946 to oversee experiments conducted  using V-2 rockets brought to the United States after World War II.  The experiments studied the upper atmosphere, solar radiation and X-ray astronomy, as well as the technology of the V-2 rocket.

Members
An organizing meeting was held at Princeton University 27 Feb 1946.

The original committee members were:
 Ernst Henry Krause, Naval Research Laboratory
 G. K. Megerian (secretary), General Electric Co.
 W. G. Dow, University of Michigan
 M. J. E. Golay, U.S. Army Signal Corps
 C. F. Green, General Electric Co.
 K. H. Kingdon, General Electric Co.
 M. H. Nichols, Princeton University
 James Van Allen, Johns Hopkins University
 Fred Lawrence Whipple, Harvard University

See also
 Operation Paperclip
 Hermes project
 List of V-2 test launches
 USA V-2 period

References
 Preparing for spaceflight, Encyclopædia Britannica
 Upper Atmosphere Rocket Research Panel (V-2 Panel) Reports, Smithsonian Institution

Rocketry